Marcel Sedille-Courbon (born 1903, date of death unknown) was a Belgian bobsledder. He competed in the four-man event at the 1928 Winter Olympics.

References

1903 births
Year of death missing
Belgian male bobsledders
Olympic bobsledders of Belgium
Bobsledders at the 1928 Winter Olympics
Sportspeople from Brussels